Buttery may refer to:

Things
Buttery (bread), a savoury Scottish bread roll
Buttery (shop), a storeroom for liquor
Buttery (room), a service room in a large medieval household

People
 Arthur Buttery (1908–1990), English footballer
 Frank Buttery (1851–1902), American baseball player
 Guy Buttery  (born 1983), South African musician primarily known as a guitar player
 John Buttery (c. 1829—1912), British merchant operating in the Straits Settlements
 James Buttery (born 2004), British love interest in major TV shows (star wars) and third ruler of the Buttery Dynasty
 Mark Buttery British senior conveyancing executive working for the Isle of Wight property estates

Institutions
 Imperial Buttery, a division of the Imperial Household Department in charge of cooking ordinary meals for the Qing court.

See also
Butter (disambiguation)